Matelica is a   (municipality) of the Province of Macerata in the Italian region of Marche.

Geography
Matelica lies in an ample valley where the Braccano creek joins the Esino river, dominated by the town from an eastern ravine.

Matelica borders on the following municipalities: Apiro, Castelraimondo, Cerreto d'Esi, Esanatoglia, Fabriano, Fiuminata, Gagliole, Poggio San Vicino, San Severino Marche.

Climate
The climate is dictated by the Apennines and, to a lesser extent, by the temperate Adriatic Sea on the east. Consequently, Matelica enjoys a somewhat continental climate with cool winters and hot, dry summers. In winter, Matelica occasionally experiences sub-zero temperatures and snowfall between December and February. Highest summer temperatures can be well above  in July and August. In keeping with the layout of the valley, the dominant winds are along the north–south direction, those from the south being more frequent but weaker than those from the north.

History
The first human settlements in the area can be traced to the Umbri and Picentes and date back to the 1st millennium BC. Later, under Roman rule, Matelica became a municipium (70 BC). Starting from the 5th century AD, it was seat of a bishop, who for a while remained the only authority, after the fall of the Western Roman Empire. The town was then annexed to the Byzantine Empire (552). Destroyed by the Lombards in 578, it was subsequently joined to the bishopric of Camerino. From the 9th century, Matelica was under the indirect rule of the Holy Roman Empire (while belonging formally to the Papal States), then becoming a free municipality in 1160. In 1174, it was again obliterated, this time by the army of Christian I (Archbishop of Mainz). Since then, Matelica remained part of the Papal States (albeit at times under an independent Governor), until the Italian unification (1861), save for the brief Napoleonic occupation.

Main sights
The old part of town presents an  urban structure dating largely from the Middle Ages, and is punctuated by several  palazzi and churches from different periods.

Sights in the town include:
Matelica Cathedral
Church of Sant'Agostino (14th century)
Church of San Francesco (1246-1260, façade from the 18th century)
Church of Santa Maria Maddalena
Chiesa del Suffragio
Communal palace
Governor Palace and Civic Tower 
Piersanti Museum, housing a collection of artworks.
Palazzo Pettinelli

Twin towns
 Las Rosas, Argentina

References and notes

External links
  Official website